Tenda dos Milagres is a 1977 Brazilian drama film directed by Nelson Pereira dos Santos, based on the novel of the same name by Jorge Amado. Starring Hugo Carvana, Sonia Dias and Severino Dada, it exposes and satirizes racism in Brazilian society—the most notable example being a flashback scene where Brazilians are shown listening with approving interest to Nazi race theories in the late 1930s. Tenda dos Milagres was shot in Salvador, Bahia.

Cast
 Hugo Carvana as Fausto Pena
 Sonia Dias as Anna Mercedes
 Anecy Rocha as Dr. Edelweiss
 Franca Teixeira
 Mae Mirinha do Portao
 Juárez Paraíso as Pedro Archanjo
 Jards Macalé as Young Pedro
 Jehova De Carvalho as Major Damiao
 Manoel do Bonfim as Lidia Corro
 Nildo Parente as Prof. Nilo Argolo

Reception
It won the Best Film Award and Best Score Award, and dos Santos won the Best Director Award and Dias won the Best Supporting Actress Award at the 10th Festival de Brasília. It was entered into the 27th Berlin International Film Festival. The film was also selected as the Brazilian entry for the Best Foreign Language Film at the 50th Academy Awards, but was not accepted as a nominee.

See also
 List of submissions to the 50th Academy Awards for Best Foreign Language Film
 List of Brazilian submissions for the Academy Award for Best Foreign Language Film

References

External links

1977 drama films
1977 films
Brazilian drama films
Films based on works by Jorge Amado
Films directed by Nelson Pereira dos Santos
Films shot in Salvador, Bahia
Salvador, Bahia in fiction
1970s Portuguese-language films